The  is a document listing the INSEE code which defines some French geographical codes.

Statistical data coding